The John Stephenson Car Company was an American manufacturer of  carriages, horsecars, cable cars, and streetcars, based in New York City. It was founded by John Stephenson in 1831.  John Stephenson invented the first streetcar to run on rails, building this in 1832, for the New York and Harlem Railroad. A reorganization in 1867 included shortening of the company's name to the John Stephenson Company.  In the latter part of the 19th century, the company was a major builder of streetcars, constructing some 25,000 cars in the period 1876–1891 alone, including ones for export.

Its customers included many systems, in the US and other countries. Among the foreign ones were the Toronto Street Railways, Montreal Street Railway Company, the Halifax Street Railway, Mexico City's Empresa de los Ferrocarriles del Distrito Federal, Lisbon’s CCFL (Carris), and Caracas'  Tranvía Caracas and Tranvía Bolívar.

Stephenson's factory was located in Elizabeth, New Jersey, after 1898. In that year, it completed the construction of a "large factory" on a  plot of land, The New York Times reported.  The company was acquired by the J.G. Brill Company in 1904 and continued to operate under the Stephenson name until 1917, when the plant was sold to the Standard Aero Corporation for production of airplanes, and the corporation was liquidated in 1919.

See also
 List of tram builders

References

External links

John Stephenson Company history by the Mid-Continent Railway Museum
John Stephenson Company Streetcars at the Museum of the City of New York's Collections blog

Companies based in Elizabeth, New Jersey
Horsecar manufacturers
Defunct rolling stock manufacturers of the United States
Manufacturing companies established in 1831
Manufacturing companies disestablished in 1917
American companies established in 1831
1831 establishments in New York (state)
1917 disestablishments in New Jersey
1904 mergers and acquisitions
Electric vehicle manufacturers of the United States
Defunct manufacturing companies based in New York City
J. G. Brill Company